Richard Thomalla (23 October 1903 – 12 May 1945) was a war criminal and SS commander of Nazi Germany. A civil engineer by profession, he was head of the SS Central Building Administration at Lublin reservation in occupied Poland. Thomalla was in charge of construction for the Operation Reinhard death camps Bełżec, Sobibor and Treblinka during the Holocaust in Poland.

Operation Reinhardt

Born in Annahof in the former Upper Silesia region of the German Empire (now, the village of Sowin, Opole Voivodeship, Poland). Thomalla became a member of the Nazi Party in 1932: (no. 1,238,872) and SS (no. 41,206).

The first death camp to be constructed under Thomalla's supervision was Bełżec. Construction started on 1 November 1941 and was completed in March 1942. He then proceeded to design and supervise the construction of Sobibor in March 1942.  Workers employed for building the camp were local people from neighboring villages and towns.  These workers consisted of about eighty Jews from ghettos within the vicinity of the camp.  A squad of ten watchmen trained at Trawniki concentration camp guarded these workers.  Upon completion of the camp, these Jews were shot.  When Thomalla completed his building assignment in Sobibor he was replaced there as commandant by Franz Stangl in April 1942. He then proceeded to Treblinka which copied the design of Sobibor, with some improvements.

SS commander Erwin Lambert who had previously been assigned to the Action T4 euthanasia program and had constructed the new gas chambers in Treblinka, testified about Thomalla:

Between July 1942 and October 1943, around 850,000 people were murdered in Treblinka.  Thomalla was reportedly executed by the NKVD (Soviet secret police) in Jičín, Czechoslovakia on 12 May 1945.

References

1903 births
1945 deaths
Holocaust perpetrators in Poland
People from Nysa County
People from the Province of Silesia
Nazi leaders assassinated by the Allies
German civil engineers
Operation Reinhard
SS-Hauptsturmführer
Executed Nazi concentration camp personnel
People killed in NKVD operations
Nazis executed by the Soviet Union by firearm
Executed mass murderers